The Aerobic Gymnastics European Championships are the European Championships for aerobic gymnastics. They have been organized by the European Union of Gymnastics since 1999.

Championships

Medal table
 Last updated after the 2019 Aerobic Gymnastics European Championships (includes junior and senior results)

References

 
Recurring sporting events established in 1999